Crambus averroellus is a moth in the family Crambidae. It was described by Graziano Bassi in 1990. It is found in Saudi Arabia.

References

Crambini
Moths described in 1990
Moths of Asia